Bermuda competed at the 2019 World Championships in Athletics in Doha, Qatar, from 27 September–6 October 2019.

Results
(q – qualified, NM – no mark, SB – season best)

Men 
Field events

References

External links
Doha｜WCH 19｜World Athletics

2019
World Athletics Championships
Bermuda